Dominica Erica Westling (born 2 October 1984 in Uppsala, Uppsala County) is a Swedish actress, model and nanny.

Early life
Westling was born in Uppsala, Uppsala County in Sweden as the oldest child and only daughter of two children. She attended secondary school in Uppsala before moving to London, pursuing a career in modeling and acting. She has studied theatre and television acting, both in the UK and the US.

Career
Westling started her modelling career in Sweden, appearing in many magazines in her home country, including Slitz and Moore.
.

Nevertheless, it was when Westling moved to the UK that her career in entertainment first took off, as she appeared in many national magazines such as Maxim (UK), FHM (UK) and Nuts (UK). 
.

Having lived in the UK for six years, Westling moved to the US and worked for Melissa Rivers as her son’s nanny, hence Westling had the opportunity of appearing as herself on the TV reality show Joan & Melissa: Joan Knows Best?, aired on WEtv. She has also been featured in Hollywood films Three7Nine and Murder 101.

Since her modeling career began, Westling has appeared in several music videos including 88-Keys ft. Kanye Wests video for ’Stay Up! (Viagra)’   and Massari – Bad girl. She has also appeared in music videos for artists The Mitchell Brothers (UK) and Junior Jack (Europe).

, Westling was seen on Swedish comedy TV-show Wipeout, competing for Sweden.

Controversy
In early 2010, it was reported that NBA player Shaquille O’Neal had an affair with Westling, whilst still married to Shaunie O’Neal. When asked about his alleged affair with Westling, Shauquille’s only reply at the time was ”no comment”, while Westling has not commented.

Acting

Filmography

Television

References

External links
 
 

1984 births
Living people
People from Uppsala
Swedish female models